Sedum obtusatum is a species of flowering plant in the family Crassulaceae known by the common name Sierra stonecrop. It is native to the Sierra Nevada and adjacent high mountain ranges of California, its distribution extending north into Oregon and east into Nevada. It grows in rocky mountain habitat.

Description
It is a succulent plant forming basal rosettes of waxy leaves. The leaves are oval or spoon shaped and up to 3 centimeters long, with smaller ones occurring farther up the stem. The leaves are green to blue green to red tinged or all red. The inflorescence is an erect, sometimes flat-topped array of many flowers. The flowers have white petals tinged with green, yellow, or orange. It typically blooms from May to June.

Though it is not an obligatory host, it is described as a beneficial organism for the Euptoieta claudia butterfly.

Variety
One variety of this species, var. paradisum, is a very rare plant limited to the Trinity Mountains of California; it is sometimes treated as a species in its own right, the Canyon Creek stonecrop (Sedum paradisum).

References

External links
Jepson Manual Treatment
USDA Plants Profile
Flora of North America
Photo gallery

obtusatum
Flora of California
Flora of Oregon
Flora of Nevada
Flora of the Klamath Mountains
Flora of the Sierra Nevada (United States)
~
Flora without expected TNC conservation status